Elizabeth Ann Eckford (born October 4, 1941) is one of the Little Rock Nine, a group of African-American students who, in 1957, were the first black students ever to attend classes at the previously all-white Little Rock Central High School in Little Rock, Arkansas.  The integration came as a result of the 1954 United States Supreme Court ruling Brown v. Board of Education. Eckford's public ordeal was captured by press photographers on the morning of September 4, 1957, after she was prevented from entering the school by the Arkansas National Guard. A dramatic snapshot by Will Counts of the Arkansas Democrat showed the young girl being followed and threatened by an angry white mob; this and other photos of the day's startling events were circulated around the US and the world by the press.

Counts's image was the unanimous selection by the Pulitzer jury for a 1958 Pulitzer Prize, but since the story had earned then-rival  Arkansas Gazette two other Pulitzer Prizes already, the Pulitzer board awarded the prize to another photographer for a pleasant photograph of a two-year-old boy in Washington, D.C. A different photo taken by Counts of Alex Wilson, a black reporter for the Memphis Tri-State Defender being beaten by the angry mob in Little Rock the same day, was chosen as the "News Picture of the Year" for 1957 by the National Press Photographers Association. This image by Counts prompted President Dwight D. Eisenhower to send federal troops to Little Rock.

Eckford only spent one year at Little Rock Central High where she and the other black students were tormented throughout. In the years since, she has struggled through life, and twice attempted suicide. She was subsequently diagnosed with post-traumatic stress disorder.

Background

On September 4, 1957, Eckford and eight other African American students (known as the Little Rock Nine) made an unsuccessful attempt to enter Little Rock Central High School, which had been segregated. An angry mob of about 400 surrounded the school that day, with the complicity of the Arkansas National Guard.

Fifteen-year-old Eckford tried to enter the school, while soldiers of the National Guard, under orders from Arkansas Governor Orval Faubus, stepped in her way to prevent her from entering. Eventually, she gave up and tried to flee to a bus stop through the mob of segregationists who surrounded and threatened to lynch her. Once Eckford got to the bus stop, she couldn't stop crying. A reporter, Benjamin Fine, having in mind his own 15-year-old daughter, sat down next to Eckford. He tried to comfort her and told her, "don't let them see you cry." Soon, she was also protected by a white woman named Grace Lorch who escorted her onto a city bus.

The original plan was to have the nine children arrive together, but when the meeting place was changed the night before, the Eckford family's lack of a telephone left Elizabeth uninformed of the change. Instructions were given by Daisy Bates, a strong activist for desegregation, for the nine students to wait for her so that they could all walk together to the rear entrance of the school. This last-minute change caused Elizabeth to be the first to take a different route to school, walking up to the front entrance completely alone. Elizabeth Eckford's family was not informed of the meeting and didn't know that the school board asked the parents to accompany her. Also, Eckford rode a public bus alone to the segregated school. That day, Elizabeth wore a starched black-and-white dress, and she covered her face under black sunglasses. Elizabeth also held her school book in her hand. As she walked toward the school, Elizabeth was surrounded by a crowd of armed guards and a mob of people, and she did not see any black faces. The mob included men, women, and teenagers (white students) who opposed integration. The white teenagers chanted "Two, four, six, eight, we ain't gonna integrate." Elizabeth attempted to go into the school through the mob but was denied entrance. Eckford walked to a bus bench at the end of the block. Eckford described her experience:

Even though Elizabeth Eckford would one day be known as a member of the Little Rock Nine, at this point in the school day, she was all alone, making her the first African-American student to integrate a white southern high school.

For the next two weeks, the Little Rock Nine stayed home to study instead of going to the Little Rock Central High School. President Dwight D. Eisenhower was reluctant to do anything about the mob or the rioting. Eisenhower summoned Orval Faubus, the Governor of Arkansas to intervene and asked for the withdrawal of all troops from the High School after Elizabeth Eckford's experience attempting to enter the school the first time.

On September 23, 1957, the Little Rock Nine approached Central High again, and Elizabeth Eckford along with the other eight students, accompanied by city policemen, were let into the high school through a side door. The reaction from the mob was described as follows:

The Arkansas National Guard, under orders from the governor, and an angry mob of about 400 surrounded the school and prevented them from going in. On September 23, 1957, a mob of about 1000 people surrounded the school again as the students attempted to enter. The following day, President Dwight D. Eisenhower took control of the Arkansas National Guard from the governor and sent the 101st Airborne Division to accompany the students to school for protection. Both federal troops and federalized National Guardsmen were deployed at the school for the entirety of the school year, although they were unable to prevent incidents of violence against the group inside, such as Eckford being thrown down a flight of stairs.

All of the city's high schools were closed the following year, so Eckford did not graduate from Central High School. However, she had taken correspondence and night courses garnering enough credits for her high school diploma. In 1958, Eckford and the rest of the Little Rock Nine were awarded the Spingarn Medal by the National Association for the Advancement of Colored People (NAACP), as was Ms. Bates.

Later life
Eckford was accepted by Knox College in Illinois, but chose to return to Little Rock to be near her family. She later attended Central State University in Wilberforce, Ohio, where she earned a BA in history. In 2018, Eckford was awarded an honorary doctorate from Knox College.

Eckford served in the United States Army for five years, first as a pay clerk, and then as an information specialist. She also wrote for the Fort McClellan (Alabama) and the Fort Benjamin Harrison (Indiana) newspapers. After that, she has worked as a waitress, history teacher, welfare worker, unemployment and employment interviewer, and a military reporter. She is a probation officer in Little Rock.

In 1997, she shared the Father Joseph Biltz Award—presented by the National Conference for Community and Justice—with Hazel Bryan Massery, a then-segregationist student at Central High School who appeared in several of the 1957 photographs screaming at the young Elizabeth. During the reconciliation rally of 1997, the two women made speeches together. But later their friendship broke up, with Eckford reflecting, "[Hazel] wanted me to be cured and be over it and for this not to go on anymore. She wanted me to be less uncomfortable so that she wouldn't feel responsible." In 1999, President Bill Clinton presented the nation's highest civilian award, the Congressional Gold Medal, to the members of the Little Rock Nine.

On the morning of January 1, 2003, one of Eckford's two sons, Erin Eckford, age 26, was shot and killed by police in Little Rock. The Arkansas Democrat-Gazette reported that the police officers had unsuccessfully tried to disarm him with a beanbag round after he had fired several shots from his rifle. When Eckford pointed his rifle towards them, the police officers shot him. His mother feared that his death was "suicide by police". Erin, she said, had suffered from mental illness but had been off his prescribed medication for several years. The newspaper later reported that prosecutors investigating the fatal shooting had decided that the police officers concerned were justified in shooting Eckford.

In 2018, 60 years after leaving Little Rock Central High, Eckford told her story in her first autobiography, The Worst First Day: Bullied While Desegregating Little Rock Central High. The book was coauthored with Dr. Eurydice Stanley and Grace Stanley of Pensacola, Florida. Grace was 15 years old when she worked on the project, the same age Eckford was when she desegregated Central High. The Worst First Day tells Eckford's experiences in verse. It features the graphic artwork of Rachel Gibson and the photography of Will Counts. Eckford traveled to New Zealand in 2019 to teach American civil rights history to more than 4,000 students with Dr. Stanley at the request of high school teacher Roydon Agent, author of Public Image, Private Shame.

On November 19, 2022, Elizabeth Eckford spoke at the keel-laying ceremony of the attack submarine USS Arkansas (SSN-800) at Newport News Shipbuilding in Newport News, Virginia, after she and Ernest Green, Gloria Ray Karlmark, Carlotta Walls LaNier and Thelma Mothershed-Wair etched their initials onto metal plates that were then welded onto the keel. The plates will remain affixed to the submarine throughout its life. Melba Pattillo Beals and Minnijean Brown-Trickey were also named sponsors of the ship, and all members of the Little Rock Nine were honored. Eckford said “(Former Navy) Secretary Ray Mabus asked us to be supporters of the ship and its crew. I signed on to be a foster grandmother...President Eisenhower sent 1,000 paratroopers to Little Rock to disperse a mob, bring order, and they made it possible for us to enter Central High School. From that point, I’ve had very high regard for specially trained forces.”

Media portrayals
Actress Lisa Marie Russell portrayed Eckford in the Disney Channel movie The Ernest Green Story (1993). Amandla Stenberg portrayed Eckford during a segment on the show Drunk History (2019).

Bibliography
Notes

References  

 

 

 

1941 births
Living people
United States Army soldiers
Activists from Little Rock, Arkansas
Little Rock Nine
People notable for being the subject of a specific photograph
Spingarn Medal winners
Photographs of protests
1950s photographs
People with post-traumatic stress disorder